Franks Field is a census-designated place in the town of Sanborn, Ashland County, Wisconsin, United States. Its population was 154 as of the 2010 census. Franks Field is located on the Bad River Indian Reservation.

References

Bad River Band of the Lake Superior Tribe of Chippewa Indians
Census-designated places in Ashland County, Wisconsin
Census-designated places in Wisconsin